is a Japanese female mixed martial artist, kickboxer and professional wrestler, occasionally nicknamed .

Background
After graduating from college, she started training in Japanese style of catch wrestling and other combat sports for dieting purposes.

Mixed martial arts career

Early career
On  at Smackgirl 2006: Legend of Extreme Women, Fujino got her third straight win, defeating Mai Ichii via unanimous decision.

Valkyrie

Fujino choked Saito unconscious with a rear-naked choke in less than thirty seconds.

Jewels
She won the fight by unanimous decision.

She won the fight by unanimous decision. She was defeated by unanimous decision.

On , Fujino made her Pancrase debut at Pancrase 247. She was scheduled to face Monica Lovato, but Lovato suffered an injury and Fujino instead faced Amber Brown. She defeated Brown by submission due to a neck crank in the second round. She defeated Song by submission due to a rear-naked choke in the second round. She was defeated by unanimous decision.

In her North American MMA debut, Fujino faced Jessica Aguilar on June 21, 2014 at World Series of Fighting 10: Branch vs. Taylor. She lost the fight via unanimous decision.

Deep Jewels and Road FC
Returning to Japan, Fujino was scheduled to fight Ayaka Miura at Deep - Jewels 6 on November 3, 2014. She won the fight by unanimous decision.

Fujino was scheduled to face Emi Tomimatsu at Deep - Dream Impact 2014: Omisoka Special on December 31, 2014. She won the fight by unanimous decision.

Fujino made her Road FC debut against Jeong Eun Park at Road FC 023 on May 2, 2015. She beat Park by majority decision.

Fujino fought a rematch with Mizuki Inoue at Deep - Jewels 9 on August 29, 2015, for the Deep Jewels Strawweight Championship. Inoue successfully defended her title, winning the fight by unanimous decision.

Fujino faced Nori Date at Deep - Jewels 10 on November 23, 2015. She won the fight by first-round submission, locking in a rear naked choke after just 47 seconds.

Fujino was scheduled to fight the future UFC strawweight champion Zhang Weili at Rebels 45 on August 7, 2016. Weili won the fight by a second-round TKO.

Fujino faced another future UFC strawweight, Yan Xiaonan, at Road FC 034 on November 19, 2016. Midway through the first round, an inadvertent clash of heads rendered Fujino unable to continue. The fight was accordingly called a no contest.

Fujino was scheduled to face Natalia Denisova Road FC 037 on March 11, 2017. She won the bout with a second-round rear naked choke.

Back in Japan, Fujino faced Hyun Ju Baek at Deep 79 Impact on September 16, 2017. She won the fight by a first-round rear naked choke.

Fujino was scheduled to fight Aline Sattelmayer at Road FC 044 on November 11, 2017. She won the fight by unanimous decision.

Pancrase
In early 2018, Fujino signed with Pancrase. She was scheduled to make her promotional return against Sharon Jacobson at Pancrase 296 on May 20, 2018. She won the fight by unanimous decision.

Fujino was scheduled to face the former Pancrase strawweight champion Viviane Araújo at Pancrase 298 on August 5, 2018. Araújo won the bout by a third-round TKO.

Fujino was scheduled to face Kseniia Guseva at Pancrase 304 on April 14, 2019. She won the fight by unanimous decision.

Fujino fought Edna Oliveira Ajala at Pancrase 308 on September 29, 2019. Fujino was awarded a TKO victory at the end of the second round, as Ajala had to withdraw with a wrist injury.

Fujino faced Hyun Ji Jang for the Pancrase Women's Strawweight Championship at Pancrase 311 on December 11, 2019. She won the fight with a third-round rear-naked choke submission.

Rizin FF 
Fujino was scheduled to face Ayaka Hamasaki on September 19, 2021 at Rizin 30. She lost the fight by unanimous decision.

Loss of Pancrase title
Fujino faced Karen in her first title defence of the Pancrase Women's Strawweight Championship at Pancrase 326 on March 21, 2022. After being taken down in the 4th round and elbowed from mount, a cut was opened leading to excessive bleeding that resulted in the referee stopping the bout.

Fujino was booked to face Song Hye Yun at Pancrase 329 on September 11, 2022. However the bout was scrapped after Song had visa issues and postponed till next month. The bout was supposed to take place at Pancrase 28th Neo-Blood Tournament Finals on October 9, 2022, but for unknown reasons Fujino faced Ayaka Watanabe instead of Song Hye Yun. She won the fight via unanimous decision.

Professional wrestling career
In her last match, she went to a time limit draw with Mai Ichii on May 3, 2010.

Kickboxing and Shoot boxing career
On  at shoot boxing event Takeshi Road -bushido- The Fifth, Fujino started her kickboxing career with a TKO defeat at the hands of Girls S-Cup winner Rena Kubota after Kubota broke Fujino's nose and rendered her unable to come out for the third round.

On  at J-Girls Catch The Stone 11, Fujino defeated Nozomi Satake by unanimous decision.

On , Fujino entered the 2011 Shoot Boxing Girls S-Cup tournament. She faced Seo Hee Ham in the opening round and was defeated by majority decision.

Championships and accomplishments
Pancrase
Pancrase Women's Strawweight Championship (one time; former)

Mixed martial arts record

|-
| Win
| align=center| 26–13 (1)
|Ayaka Watanabe
|Decision (unanimous)
|Pancrase – 28th Neo-Blood Tournament Finals
|
|align=center|3
|align=center|5:00
|Tokyo, Japan
|
|-
| Loss
| align=center| 25–13 (1)
|Karen Pravajra
|TKO (doctor stoppage)
|Pancrase 326
|
|align=center|4
|align=center|3:18
|Tokyo, Japan
|
|-
| Loss
| align=center| 25–12 (1)
| Ayaka Hamasaki
|Decision (unanimous)
|Rizin 30
|
|align=center|3
|align=center|5:00
|Saitama, Japan
|
|-
| Win
| align=center| 25–11 (1)
| Hyun Ji Jang
| Submission (rear-naked choke)
| Pancrase 311
| 
| align=center| 3
| align=center| 3:20
| Tokyo, Japan
|
|-
| Win
| align=center| 24–11 (1)
| Edna Oliveira Ajala
| TKO (wrist injury)
| Pancrase 308
| 
| align=center| 2
| align=center| 5:00
| Tokyo, Japan
|
|-
| Win
| align=center| 23–11 (1)
| Kseniia Guseva
| Decision (unanimous)
| Pancrase 304
| 
| align=center| 3
| align=center| 5:00
| Tokyo, Japan
|
|-
| Loss
| align=center| 22–11 (1)
| Viviane Araújo
| TKO (doctor stoppage)
| Pancrase 298
| 
| align=center| 3
| align=center| 0:19
| Tokyo, Japan
|
|-
| Win
| align=center| 22–10 (1)
| Sharon Jacobson
| Decision (unanimous)
| Pancrase 296
| 
| align=center| 3
| align=center| 5:00
| Tokyo, Japan
|
|-
| Win
| align=center| 21–10 (1)
| Aline Sattelmayer
| Decision (unanimous)
| Road FC 044
| 
| align=center| 2
| align=center| 5:00
| Shijiazhuang, Hebei, China
|
|-
| Win
| align=center| 20–10 (1)
| Hyun Ju Baek
| Submission (rear naked choke)
| Deep 79 Impact
| 
| align=center| 1
| align=center| 1:50
| Tokyo, Japan
|
|-
| Win
| align=center| 19–10 (1)
| Natalia Denisova
| Submission (rear naked choke)
| Road FC 037
| 
| align=center| 2
| align=center| 1:25
| Seoul, South Korea
|
|-
| NC
| align=center| 18–10 (1)
| Yan Xiaonan 
| NC (cut caused by accidental headbutt)
| Road FC 034
| 
| align=center| 1
| align=center| 2:48
| Seoul, South Korea
| 
|-
| Loss
| align=center| 18–10
| Zhang Weili
| TKO (doctor stoppage)
| Rebels: Rebels 45
| 
| align=center| 2
| align=center| 2:51
| Tokyo, Japan
|
|-
| Win
| align=center| 18–9
| Yoon Ha Hong
| Submission (rear naked choke)
| Road FC 031
| 
| align=center| 1
| align=center| 0:47
| Seoul, South Korea
|
|-
| Win
| align=center| 17–9
| Nori Date
| Decision (unanimous)
| Deep - Jewels 10
| 
| align=center| 3
| align=center| 5:00
| Tokyo, Japan
| 
|-
| Loss
| align=center| 16–9
| Mizuki Inoue
| Decision (unanimous)
| Deep - Jewels 9
| 
| align=center| 3
| align=center| 5:00
| Tokyo, Japan
| 
|-
| Win
| align=center| 16–8
| Jeong Eun Park
| Decision (majority)
| Road FC 023
| 
| align=center| 2
| align=center| 5:00
| Seoul, South Korea
| 
|-
| Win
| align=center| 15–8
| Emi Tomimatsu
| Decision (unanimous)
| Deep - Dream Impact 2014: Omisoka Special
| 
| align=center| 3
| align=center| 5:00
| Saitama, Japan
| 
|-
| Win
| align=center| 14–8
| Ayaka Miura
| Decision (unanimous)
| Deep - Jewels 6
| 
| align=center| 3
| align=center| 5:00
| Tokyo, Japan
| 
|-
| Loss
| align=center| 13–8
| Jessica Aguilar
| Decision (unanimous)
| WSOF 10
| 
| align=center| 5
| align=center| 5:00
| Las Vegas, Nevada, United States
| 
|-
| Loss
| align=center| 13–7
| Mizuki Inoue
| Decision (unanimous)
| Deep - Jewels 2
| 
| align=center| 2
| align=center| 5:00
| Tokyo, Japan
| 
|-
| Win
| align=center| 13–6
| Hyo Kyung Song
| Submission (rear-naked choke)
| Deep - Jewels 1
| 
| align=center| 2
| align=center| 3:34
| Tokyo, Japan
| 
|-
| Win
| align=center| 12–6
| Amber Brown
| Submission (neck crank)
| Pancrase 247
| 
| align=center| 2
| align=center| 4:18
| Tokyo, Japan
| 
|-
| Loss
| align=center| 11–6
| Ayaka Hamasaki
| Decision (unanimous)
| Jewels 22nd Ring
| 
| align=center| 3
| align=center| 5:00
| Tokyo, Japan
| 
|-
| Win
| align=center| 11–5
| Mika Nagano
| Decision (unanimous)
| Jewels 18th Ring
| 
| align=center| 2
| align=center| 5:00
| Tokyo, Japan
| 
|-
| Win
| align=center| 10–5
| Celine Haga
| Decision (unanimous)
| Jewels 17th Ring
| 
| align=center| 2
| align=center| 5:00
| Tokyo, Japan
| 
|-
| Loss
| align=center| 9–5
| Megumi Fujii
| Decision (unanimous)
| World Victory Road Presents: Soul of Fight
| 
| align=center| 3
| align=center| 5:00
| Tokyo, Japan
| 
|-
| Win
| align=center| 9–4
| Anna Saito
| Technical Submission (rear naked choke)
| Valkyrie 08
| 
| align=center| 1
| align=center| 0:28
| Tokyo, Japan
| 
|-
| Loss
| align=center| 8–4
| Kyoko Takabayashi
| Decision (majority)
| Valkyrie 05
| 
| align=center| 3
| align=center| 3:00
| Tokyo, Japan
| 
|-
| Loss
| align=center| 8–3
| Mei Yamaguchi
| Decision (unanimous)
| Valkyrie 02
| 
| align=center| 3
| align=center| 3:00
| Tokyo, Japan
| 
|-
| Loss
| align=center| 8–2
| Tomomi Sunaba
| Decision (unanimous)
| Valkyrie 01
| 
| align=center| 3
| align=center| 3:00
| Tokyo, Japan
| 
|-
| Loss
| align=center| 8–1
| Megumi Yabushita
| Decision (unanimous)
| GCM - Demolition 080721
| 
| align=center| 3
| align=center| 3:00
| Tokyo, Japan
| 
|-
| Win
| align=center| 8–0
| Mei Yamaguchi
| Decision (split)
| Smackgirl 7th Anniversary: Starting Over
| 
| align=center| 2
| align=center| 5:00
| Tokyo, Japan
| 
|-
| Win
| align=center| 7–0
| Yuko Yamazaki
| Decision (unanimous)
| GCM - Cage Force EX Eastern Bound
| 
| align=center| 2
| align=center| 5:00
| Tokyo, Japan
| 
|-
| Win
| align=center| 6–0
| Yukiko Seki
| Decision (unanimous)
| Smackgirl 2007: Queens' Hottest Summer
| 
| align=center| 2
| align=center| 5:00
| Tokyo, Japan
| 
|-
| Win
| align=center| 5–0
| Anna Saito
| Submission (rear naked choke)
| K - GRACE 1
| 
| align=center| 1
| align=center| 2:06
| Tokyo, Japan
| 
|-
| Win
| align=center| 4–0
| Madoka Okada
| Submission (straight armbar)
| Smackgirl 2007: Will The Queen Paint The Shinjuku Skies Red?
| 
| align=center| 1
| align=center| 2:34
| Tokyo, Japan
| 
|-
| Win
| align=center| 3–0
| Mai Ichii
| Decision (unanimous)
| Smackgirl 2006: Legend of Extreme Women
| 
| align=center| 2
| align=center| 5:00
| Tokyo, Japan
| 
|-
| Win
| align=center| 2–0
| Eri Takahashi
| Submission (armbar)
| GCM - Cross Section 1
| 
| align=center| 2
| align=center| 1:56
| Tokyo, Japan
| 
|-
| Win
| align=center| 1–0
| Seri Saito
| Decision (unanimous)
| Smackgirl-F: Next Cinderella Tournament 2nd stage & SG-F7
| 
| align=center| 2
| align=center| 5:00
| Tokyo, Japan
|

Kickboxing and Shoot boxing record

|- style="background:#cfc;"
|2012-11-18
|Win
| align="left" | Ruri
|J-Girls 2012: Platinum's In The Ring Final
|Tokyo, Japan
|KO (punches)
|1
|0:44
|-  bgcolor="#FFBBBB"
|2011-08-19
||Loss
| align="left" | Seo Hee Ham
|2011 Shoot Boxing Girls S-Cup
|Tokyo, Japan
|Decision (unanimous)
|3
|2:00
|- style="background:#cfc;"
|2010-10-17
|Win
| align="left" | Nozomi Satake
|J-Girls: Catch the Stone 11
|Tokyo, Japan
|Decision (unanimous)
|3
|2:00
|-  bgcolor="#FFBBBB"
|2010-07-25
||Loss
| align="left" | Mizuki Inoue
|J-Girls: Catch The Stone 9
|Tokyo, Japan
|Decision (unanimous)
|3
|2:00
|-  bgcolor="#FFBBBB"
|2009-11-18
|Loss
| align="left" | Rena Kubota
|Shoot Boxing 2009 - Bushido 5th
|Tokyo, Japan
|TKO (doctors stoppage)
|2
|2:00
|-
| colspan=9 | Legend:

See also
 List of female mixed martial artists
 List of female kickboxers

References

External links

 
 
 
 Emi Fujino at Awakening
 Emi Fujino at Road FC

  
  
 Official blog 
 Official blog (old) 

 
  
  
  

1980 births
Living people
People from Toyohashi
Japanese female mixed martial artists
Japanese female kickboxers
Japanese female professional wrestlers
Japanese practitioners of Brazilian jiu-jitsu
Female Brazilian jiu-jitsu practitioners
Sportspeople from Aichi Prefecture
Wajitsu Keishukai
Strawweight mixed martial artists
Mixed martial artists utilizing kickboxing
Mixed martial artists utilizing catch wrestling
Mixed martial artists utilizing Brazilian jiu-jitsu
Kunlun Fight MMA Fighters